Puma Puñuna (Quechua puma cougar, puñuna bed, "cougar bed", -n a suffix, also spelled Pumapununan) is a mountain in the Cordillera Negra in the Andes of Peru which reaches a height of approximately . It lies in the Ancash Region, Aija Province, Aija District, southwest of Wank'ap'iti.

References

Mountains of Peru
Mountains of Ancash Region